Declana egregia, commonly called the South Island lichen moth or zebra lichen moth, is a moth in the family Geometridae, endemic to New Zealand. This species was first described by entomologists Baron Cajetan von Felder and Alois Friedrich Rogenhofer in 1875 under the name Chlenias egregia.

This species resembles the North Island lichen moth but has fewer and coarser wing markings. It is found only in the South Island and Stewart Island.

The caterpillars of Declana egregia feed in summer on Pseudopanax species, especially five-finger (Pseudopanax arboreus), mountain five-finger (P. colensoi), and lancewood (P. crassifolius). They are well-camouflaged, resembling a small bird-dropping when young and a Pseudopanax fruit when older. Larger larvae, up to 30 mm long, look like lichen-covered twigs and hold themselves stiffly out from the host plant by their prolegs. The moth overwinters as a pupa on the forest floor, in a loosely-spun cocoon encrusted with dirt.

The South Island lichen moth appears on the New Zealand $100 note alongside a mōhua, with a backdrop of Fiordland National Park.

References

External links  

 The South Island lichen moth discussed on RNZ Critter of the Week 27 Oct 2017

Moths described in 1875
Ennominae
Moths of New Zealand
Endemic fauna of New Zealand
Endemic moths of New Zealand